Boyd Glacier is a heavily crevassed glacier flowing west-northwest for about  to the Sulzberger Ice Shelf between Bailey Ridge and Mount Douglass in the Ford Ranges of Marie Byrd Land. It was discovered on aerial flights of the Byrd Antarctic Expedition in 1934, and named for Vernon D. Boyd, an expedition machinist, and a member of West Base of the United States Antarctic Service (1939–41).

References 

Glaciers of Marie Byrd Land